USS Verbena was a small 104-ton steamer purchased  by the Union Navy towards the end of the American Civil War.

Verbena, outfitted with a 20-pounder Parrott rifle by the Navy, was placed in service as a gunboat and assigned to the blockade of the Confederate States of America. However, most of her service was as a tugboat and as a ship’s tender.

Service history 

Verbena was originally Ino, a small wooden screw tugboat of 81 register tons, built at Brooklyn, New York by Lawrence & Foulks in 1863. She was purchased by the Navy at New York City on 7 June 1864 and commissioned at the New York Navy Yard on 11 July 1864.

On 19 July, the vessel was attached to the Potomac Flotilla for duty as a tugboat. Two days later, she deployed in the Potomac River off Point Lookout, Maryland.; and she served for most of the duration of the Civil War as a tender to the ironclad .

After the collapse of the Confederacy, Verbena received orders on 5 May 1865 to proceed to the Washington Navy Yard, where she was decommissioned on 13 June.

Verbena was sold at public auction there to W. E. Gladwick on 20 July; redocumented as Game Cock on 9 September; renamed Edward G. Burgess on 7 July 1885; and dropped from the registry in 1900.

See also 

Union Blockade

References  
 

1863 ships
Ships built by Lawrence & Foulks
Ships built in Brooklyn
Ships of the Union Navy
Gunboats of the United States Navy
Steamships of the United States Navy
Tugs of the United States Navy
Tenders of the United States Navy
American Civil War patrol vessels of the United States